Pay Ostan (also Romanized as Pay Ostān and Pey Ostān; also known as Paisu, Pey Sū, Pīstān, and Pīsū) is a village in Pir Hajat Rural District, in the Central District of Tabas County, South Khorasan Province, Iran. At the 2006 census, its population was 288, in 89 families.

References 

Populated places in Tabas County